Zasnovye is a rural locality (a selo) in Klintsovsky District, Bryansk Oblast, Russia. The population was 1 as of 2013. There is 1 street.

Geography 
Zasnovye is located 34 km south of Klintsy (the district's administrative centre) by road. Rubezhnoye is the nearest rural locality.

References 

Rural localities in Klintsovsky District